D'accord is German post-hardcore band Fjørt's debut full-length studio album, released on 21 March 2014 through This Charming Man Records.

Track listing

Personnel
Fjørt
Chris Hell – vocals, guitar
David Frings – bass, vocals
Frank Schophaus – drums

References

2014 albums
German-language albums